The Kicker is the sixth album by jazz tenor saxophonist Joe Henderson, and his first to be released on the Milestone label.  It was recorded on August 10, 1967, with one track originating from a later session on September 27, and contains performances by Henderson with trumpeter Mike Lawrence, trombonist Grachan Moncur III, pianist  Kenny Barron, bassist Ron Carter and drummer Louis Hayes. The AllMusic review by Scott Yanow states: "Joe Henderson's first recording for Milestone was very much a continuation of the adventurous acoustic music he had recorded previously for Blue Note".

Track listing
All compositions by Joe Henderson except where noted.

 "Mamacita" – 3:24  
 "The Kicker" – 4:09  
 "Chelsea Bridge" (Strayhorn) – 4:40  
 "If" – 5:37  
 "Nardis" (Davis) – 4:44  
 "Without a Song" (Eliscu, Rose, Youmans) – 6:03  
 "O Amor Em Paz (Once I Loved)" (de Moraes, Gilbert, Jobim) – 5:35  
 "Mo' Joe" – 4:09

Recorded on August 10 (tracks 1-6 & 8) & September 27 (track 7), 1967

Personnel
Joe Henderson - tenor saxophone
Mike Lawrence - trumpet (except track 7)
Grachan Moncur III - trombone (except track 7)
Kenny Barron - piano
Ron Carter - bass
Louis Hayes - drums

References

1968 albums
Milestone Records albums
Joe Henderson albums
Albums produced by Orrin Keepnews